Adamantina is an extinct genus of Jalodont shark from the Carboniferous and Permian periods. It is known mainly from isolated teeth and scales. It contains two species, A. foliacea and A. benedictae. The type species, A. benedictae, is known from the Wuchiapingian of east Greenland and the Roadian of the Kanin Peninsula, Russia. A. foliacea is known from  the late Tournaisian, late Artinskian, and the early Asselian of Russia and the late Kasimovian of Iowa, United States. There is also a likely occurrence in the upper Pennsylvanian of Brazil.

References

Carboniferous
Permian
Fish enigmatic taxa
Sharks
Prehistoric shark genera